Saint Lucia competed in the 2014 Commonwealth Games in Glasgow, Scotland from 23 July to 3 August 2014.

Athletics

St. Lucia has entered eight athletes.

Men

Field events

Women
Field events

Combined events – Heptathlon

Key
Note–Ranks given for track events are within the athlete's heat only
Q = Qualified for the next round
q = Qualified for the next round as a fastest loser or, in field events, by position without achieving the qualifying target
NR = National record
N/A = Round not applicable for the event
Bye = Athlete not required to compete in round

Boxing

Saint Lucia has entered four boxers.

Men

Netball

Saint Lucia has qualified a netball team for the first time ever.
Roster

 Germaine Altifois-Fenelon
 Denise Charles
 Ianna Hippolyte
 Rommela Hunte
 Chattnanay Justin
 Indira Laurencin
 Judie Mathurin
 Shem Maxwell
 Zalika Paul
 Delia Samuel
 Roxanne Snyder
 Saphia William

Pool A

Shooting

St. Lucia has entered two sport shooters.

Men

Swimming

St.Lucia has entered two swimmers.

Men

Table tennis

St. Lucia has entered four athletes in table tennis.

Men
Adrian Albert
Omarie Ferdinand
Jedaiah Pierre
Chris Wells

References

Nations at the 2014 Commonwealth Games
Saint Lucia at the Commonwealth Games
Comm